Cathy Ross may refer to:

 Cathy Ross (missiologist) (born 1961), New Zealand-born missiologist
 Cathy Ross (soccer) (born 1967), Canadian soccer player